Parornix cotoneasterella is a moth of the family Gracillariidae. It is known from Tajikistan and Turkmenistan.

The larvae feed on Cotoneaster avellana and Cotoneaster hissarica. They probably mine the leaves of their host plant.

References

Parornix
Moths of Asia
Moths described in 1978